The Pakistan Armed Forces Band is a Pakistani musical group which was formed in 1947 in Islamabad. The band immediately played an important role for Pakistani soldiers in providing patriotic support during the Indo-Pakistani Wars of 1965 and 1971. The band's musical traditions are derived in its connections and heritage from the British Empire, as well as Indian musical tradition. The members of the band, who are drawn from the 3 branches of the Pakistan Armed Forces, are frequently the center of attention at military ceremonies and military parades in Pakistan. It is made up of 78 members who are currently led by Major Ghulam Ali (born in 1967 in Chakwal).

Protocol activities it participates in include the Pakistan Day Parade and state arrival ceremonies hosted by the President of Pakistan for foreign leaders on state visits to Islamabad. It commonly participates in many international festivals all around the world. When having performed in China and Russia, the band went under the name of the Pakistan Tri-Services Military Band. It has also performed in Turkey in the 1990s with the Turkish Mehter Troop as well as performed during the diamond jubilee celebrations of Sultan Hassanal Bolkiah coming to the throne of Brunei in 2006. Other than the National Anthem of Pakistan and official hymns, the band performs national songs such as Jeevay Jeevay Pakistan and Aiy Puttar Hattan Tey Nahin Vikday.

A documentary film called Band Baja Aur Pakistan was released in 2017, being the first Pakistani documentary on marching bands, featuring the armed forces band.

Relationship with the Army School of Music
All musicians of the band are trained by the Pakistan Army School of Music (پاکستان آرمی اسکول آف موسیقی), which was founded in 1952 by Captain Donald Keeling, who was a military director from the United Kingdom. It has been based in Abbottabad since 1956 and was linked with the Baloch Regimental Centre from 1965 to 2004. The main purpose of the institute was to impart musical training officers and soldiers of the who want to join the band. It takes between five months up to nearly two years for a soldier to graduate from the school and join the armed forces band. It is currently under the leadership of Lieutenant Colonel Abdul Wahab Khan.

There are 5 main musical courses in the school of music, which include:

 Band Master Course
 Military Band Beginners Course
 Military Band Advanced Course
 Trumpeter's Training Course
 Bugler's Training Course

See also
Central Military Band of the People's Liberation Army of China
Military Brass Band of the Commandant Regiment of the Ministry of Defense of Tajikistan
Omani Royal Guard Military Band

Sources

External links
 Pakistan Army Band, Cape Town , Waterfront, 8th of November 2015
 Pakistan performs at Spasskaya Tower 2015 International Military Music Festival Moscow 2015

Military bands
Pakistani musical groups
Military of Pakistan
Military units and formations established in 1947
1947 establishments in Pakistan
Musical groups established in 1947